Glendale/19th Avenue is a station on the Metro light rail line in Phoenix, Arizona. It was opened as part of Phase 1 of the Northwest Extension of the system on March 19, 2016.

References

External links
 Valley Metro map
 Northwest Light Rail Extension Opens

Valley Metro Rail stations in Phoenix, Arizona
2016 establishments in Arizona
Railway stations in the United States opened in 2016